In road-transport terminology, lane centering, also known as auto steer or autosteer, is an advanced driver-assistance system that keeps a road vehicle centered in the lane, relieving the driver of the task of steering. Lane centering is similar to lane departure warning and lane keeping assist, but rather than warn the driver, or bouncing the car away from the lane edge, it keeps the car centered in the lane. Together with adaptive cruise control (ACC), this feature may allow unassisted driving for some length of time. It is also part of automated lane keeping systems.

Starting in 2019 semi-trailer trucks have also been fitted with this technology.

Terminology

Lane departure warning generates a warning when the vehicle crosses a line, while lane keeping assist helps the vehicle to avoid crossing a line, standardized in ISO 11270:2014, and lane centering keeps the vehicle centered in the lane and almost always comes with steering assist to help the vehicle take gentle turns at highway speeds.

In farming, "machine autosteer" is a technology which make automated steering and positioning of a machine in a landscape.

History
The first commercially available lane centering systems were based on off-the-shelf systems created by Mobileye, such as Tesla Autopilot and Nissan ProPilot, although Tesla switched to an in-house design when Mobileye ended their partnership. A handful of companies like Bosch, Delphi, ZF and Mobileye provide sensors, control units, and even algorithms to car makers, who then integrate and refine those systems.

While not directly attributable to lane centering, crash rates on the Tesla Model S and Model X equipped with the Mobileye system were reduced by almost 40% while Tesla Autopilot was in use.

Operation

The lane detection system used by the lane departure warning system uses image processing techniques to detect lane lines from real-time camera images fed from cameras mounted on the automobile. Examples of image processing techniques used include the Hough transform, Canny edge detector, Gabor filter and deep learning. A basic flowchart of how a lane detection algorithm works to produce lane departure warning is shown in the figures.

Limitations 
Features that differentiate systems are how well they perform on turns, speed limitations and whether the system resumes from a stop.

Current lane centering systems rely on visible lane markings. They typically cannot decipher faded, missing, incorrect or overlapping lane markings. Markings covered in snow, or old lane markings left visible, can hinder the ability of the system. GM's Super Cruise only works on known freeways that have been previously mapped, as it uses a combination of these maps and a precise GNSS position provided by Trimble's RTX GNSS correction service to determine if Super Cruise can be enabled or not.

Most vehicles require the driver's hands to remain on the wheel, but GM's Super Cruise monitors the driver's eyes to ensure human attention to the road, and thus allows hands-free driving.

2018 Mobileye EyeQ4
Mobileye claimed in 2018 that 11 automakers would incorporate their EyeQ4 chip that enables L2+ and L3 autonomous systems; this would collectively represent more than 50% of the auto industry. Level 2 automation is also known as "hands off": this system takes full control of the vehicle (accelerating, braking, and steering). Level 3 is also known as "eyes off": the driver can safely turn their attention away from driving, e.g. the driver can text or watch a movie.

In 2018, the average selling price for the EyeQ4 chip to auto makers was about $450 U.S. dollars.

Nissan uses the EyeQ4 chip for their hands-off ProPilot 2.0 system.

Regulations

In the United-States, in 2018, lane centering systems are not covered by any Federal Motor Vehicle Safety Standards, according to the NHTSA.

Territories such as the European union, Japan, Russia, Turkey, Egypt and the United Kingdom follow UNECE 79 regulation. In those territories following UNECE 79 regulation, automatically commanded steering functions are classified in several categories, for instance:
 Category A function helps the driver at speed no greater than 10 km/h for parking maneuvering;
 Category B1 function helps the driver to keep the vehicle within the chosen lane;
 Category B2 function "keeps the vehicle within its lane by influencing the lateral movement of the vehicle for extended periods without further driver command/confirmation";
 Category C and D and E are related to specific manoeuvres such as lane change

While all those functions are related to automated steering, lane centering is a concept close to the concept related to category B2, while LKA is closer to category B1.

Sample of level 2 automated cars

Because all of these vehicles also have adaptive cruise control that can work in tandem with lane centering, they meet the SAE standard for level 2 automation.  Adaptive cruise control and lane centering are often only available in more expensive trim levels rather than just the base trim.  An example is the Hyundai Kona EV, which only has adaptive cruise control available on the "ultimate" edition.

Nissan ProPilot

Nissan ProPilot is based on Mobileye technology and assists with acceleration, steering and braking input under single lane highway driving conditions. ProPilot keeps the car centered in the lane and will deactivate below 31 mph if not tracking a car in front of it. Adaptive cruise control handles stop-and-go traffic if stopped for less than 4 seconds and helps maintain a set vehicle speed and maintain a safe distance between the vehicle ahead. ProPilot, which can follow curves, uses a forward-facing camera, forward-facing radar and other sensors. A traffic sign recognition system provides drivers with the most recent speed limit information detected by a camera on the windshield, in front of the rear-view mirror.

In a review by ExtremeTech, ProPilot worked well in 1,000 miles of testing and only on some twisty sections did it require driver intervention. During Euro NCAP 2018 testing, ProPilot failed some tests as did all other systems tested. Consumer Reports indicates that ProPilot is especially helpful in stop and go traffic.

Honda Sensing/AcuraWatch
Honda Sensing and AcuraWatch are a suite of advanced driver assistance features including Lane Keeping Assist System (LKAS) which helps keep the vehicle centered in a lane, by applying mild steering torque if the vehicle is deviating from the center of a detected lane with no turn-signal activation by the driver. Mild steering torque means the system will not work on tight turns; additionally, the system does not work at speeds below 45 mph.  The Honda Sensing and AcuraWatch packages also include: 
 Adaptive cruise control
 Traffic-sign recognition
 Auto high beam

2018 evaluation by IIHS
Quote from David Zuby, chief research officer at the American Insurance Institute for Highway Safety:

The report indicated that only the Tesla Model 3 stayed within the lane on all 18 trials.

Quote from the report:

See also
 Advanced driver-assistance systems
 Autonomous car

References

External links
 Comma.ai open source lane centering system
 Real-world analysis of fatal run-out-of-lane crashes using the national motor vehicle crash causation survey to assess lane keeping technologies  Real-World Analysis of Fatal Run-Out-of-Lane Crashes Using the National Motor Vehicle Crash Causation Survey to Assess Lane Keeping Technologies

News
 Which Cars Have Autopilot for 2019?
 Not much faith in lane-centering technology Oct 2019
 Cars with Autopilot in May 2019
 Why Level 3 automated technology has failed to take hold.  July 21, 2019

Comparisons
 Tesla's Autopilot battles BMW's driver-assist  Youtube Dec 27, 2019

Advanced driver assistance systems

Warning systems